Secrets of Love is an unreleased Hindi film, which is directed by Ritesh S Kumar and produced by Velji Gala. It is inspired by the events of Osho's life, starring Ravi Kishan as Osho, with Vivek Anand Mishra (young Osho) and Jayesh Kapoor as supporting actors. The film was scheduled to release on MX Player on 6 March 2023.

Premise
The film is based on events during the life of Osho.

Cast 
 Ravi Kishan as Osho
 Vivek Mishra
 Jayesh Kapoor

Production
Filming completed in mid-February 2021.

References

External links
 
 Secrets of Love on Times of India

Unreleased Hindi-language films
Upcoming films